Lindsey Napela Berg (born July 16, 1980) is an American retired volleyball player who last played for Fenerbahçe Istanbul in Turkey. She was born in Honolulu, Hawaii, and played volleyball for the University of Minnesota. She played in three Olympic Games for the United States national team, winning two silver medals.

Career

College
Berg attended the University of Minnesota and played on the school's volleyball team. She was named to the All-Big Ten team in 1999, 2000 and 2001. She also set a Minnesota record for most career assists.

Professional

Berg played for the Minnesota Chill of the United States Professional Volleyball league in 2002. She was named the Outstanding Server and Outstanding Setter. From 2005 to 2008, she played in the Italian Serie A League.

International
Berg joined the national team in January 2003. That year she played in all 44 of the team's matches and led the team in total assists with 1,093. She was named the best setter of the Pan American Cup and helped the U.S. win the tournament. In 2004, Berg was again named the best setter of the Pan American Cup, as the U.S. won the silver medal. She played for the team in the 2004 Summer Olympics.

Berg was named the best setter of the Pan American Cup for the third straight year in 2005, but the U.S. did not medal. She was also named best setter of the NORCECA Continental Championship, helping the U.S. win gold. In 2006, Berg played for the U.S. in the World Grand Prix. In 2007, she helped the U.S. win the bronze medal at the FIVB World Cup and the silver medal at the NORCECA Championship.

Berg was the co-captain of the team at the 2008 Summer Olympics. She played in 25 sets during the Games, and the U.S. won the silver medal. She was named the USA Volleyball Female Indoor Athlete of the Year for that year. Berg then took part of the 2009 season off to recover from surgery after the Olympics. In 2010, she played in the FIVB World Championship, and the U.S. finished fourth.

At the 2011 FIVB World Cup, Berg started 10 of 11 matches and helped the U.S. finish second and qualify for the 2012 Summer Olympics. She helped the U.S. win the gold medal at the 2011 NORCECA Volleyball Championship and was named the tournament's best setter. She also helped the U.S. win the gold medal at the FIVB World Grand Prix. She was named the USA Volleyball Indoor Female Athlete of the Year for 2011. At the 2012 Summer Olympics, Berg was the starting setter in seven of eight matches. The U.S. won the silver medal.

Personal

Berg was born in Honolulu, Hawaii, on July 16, 1980. She graduated from Punahou High School in Hawaii and the University of Minnesota.

Berg underwent Orthokine treatments before the 2012 Olympics to treat chronic pain in her left knee that had been affecting her for four years. She paid €6,000 (about $7,400) for the procedure, which neither her professional volleyball team in Italy nor the United States Olympic team would cover.

Lindsey conducts youth volleyball camps. She has also been an assistant coach for University of Hawai'i Women's Volleyball team.

Awards

Individuals
 2003 Pan-American Cup "Best Setter"
 2004 Pan-American Cup "Best Setter"
 2005 NORCECA Championship "Best Setter"
 2005 Pan-American Cup "Best Setter"
 2011 NORCECA Championship "Best Setter"

Club
 CEV Cup 2012-13|2012-13 CEV Cup -  Runner-Up, with Fenerbahçe

References

1980 births
Living people
Volleyball players from Honolulu
Punahou School alumni
Olympic silver medalists for the United States in volleyball
Volleyball players at the 2004 Summer Olympics
Volleyball players at the 2008 Summer Olympics
Volleyball players at the 2012 Summer Olympics
Minnesota Golden Gophers women's volleyball players
Fenerbahçe volleyballers
Medalists at the 2012 Summer Olympics
Medalists at the 2008 Summer Olympics
American women's volleyball players
Setters (volleyball)
Expatriate volleyball players in Italy
Expatriate volleyball players in Turkey
American expatriate sportspeople in Italy
American expatriate sportspeople in Turkey